The Serbia women's national under-20 basketball team is the women's basketball team, administered by the Basketball Federation of Serbia, that represents Serbia in international under-20 (under age 20) women's basketball competitions, consisting mainly of the FIBA U20 Women's European Championship.

Competitive record

Coaches

Rosters 
 2007 European Championship — 2nd place
Tamara Radočaj, Marina Ristić, Jelena Radić, Maja Šćekić, Tamara Bajić, Jovana Rad, Adrijana Knežević, Zorica Mitov, Dunja Prčić, Nina Đoković, Biljana Stjepanović, Miljana Bojović
 2008 European Championship — 3rd place
Ivana Musović, Dragana Gobeljić, Sonja Petrović, Ana Dabović, Smiljana Ivanović, Iva Roglić, Jelena Milovanović, Maja Miljković, Nina Bogićević, Jelena Cerina, Tijana Ajduković, Irena Matović
 2018 European Championship — 2nd place
Nevena Naumčev, Mina Đorđević, Vladana Vujisić, Tamara Jovančević, Lara Radulović, Marijana Zukanović, Teodora Turudić, Milica Bojović, Ivana Raca, Nevena Vučković, Ivana Katanić, Marija Stojanović

See also 
 Serbia men's national under-20 basketball team

References

External links
 Basketball Federation of Serbia
 FIBA Europe

U20
Women's national under-20 basketball teams